Abbes Saidi (born February 9, 1983) is a Paralympian middle-distance runner from Tunisia. He competed at the 2004, 2008 and 2016 Paralympics and won five medals, including a gold in the  T35-38 relay in 2004 and a gold in the 1500 m T38 event in 2016.

References

External links

 

Paralympic athletes of Tunisia
Athletes (track and field) at the 2004 Summer Paralympics
Athletes (track and field) at the 2008 Summer Paralympics
Athletes (track and field) at the 2012 Summer Paralympics
Athletes (track and field) at the 2016 Summer Paralympics
Paralympic gold medalists for Tunisia
Paralympic silver medalists for Tunisia
Paralympic bronze medalists for Tunisia
Living people
World record holders in Paralympic athletics
Medalists at the 2004 Summer Paralympics
Medalists at the 2008 Summer Paralympics
Medalists at the 2016 Summer Paralympics
1983 births
Paralympic medalists in athletics (track and field)
Athletes (track and field) at the 2020 Summer Paralympics
Tunisian male middle-distance runners
21st-century Tunisian people